Burton City is an unincorporated community in Wayne County, in the U.S. state of Ohio.

History
Burton City was originally called Fairview, and under the latter name was laid out in 1850. A post office called Baughman was established in 1852, the name was changed to Burton City in 1872, and the post office closed in 1918.

References

Unincorporated communities in Wayne County, Ohio
Unincorporated communities in Ohio